Melt blowing is a conventional fabrication method of micro- and nanofibers where a polymer melt is extruded through small nozzles surrounded by high speed blowing gas. The randomly deposited fibers form a nonwoven sheet product applicable for filtration, sorbents, apparels and drug delivery systems. The substantial benefits of melt blowing are simplicity, high specific productivity and solvent-free operation. Choosing an appropriate combination of polymers with optimized rheological and surface properties, scientists have been able to produce melt-blown fibers with an average diameter as small as 36 nm.

History 

During volcanic activity a fibrous material may be drawn by vigorous wind from molten basaltic magma called Pele's hair. The same phenomenon applies for melt blowing of polymers. The first research on melt blowing was a naval attempt in the US to produce fine filtration materials for radiation measurements on drone aircraft in the 1950s. Later on, Exxon Corporation developed the first industrial process based on the melt blowing principle with high throughput levels. China produces 40% of the non-woven fabric in the world with the majority produced in Hebei province (2018).

Polymers 

Polymers with thermoplastic behavior are applicable for melt blowing. The main polymer types commonly processed with melt blowing:
 Polypropylene
 Polystyrene
 Polyesters
 Polyurethane
 Polyamides (nylons)
 Polyethylene
 Polycarbonate

Uses 

The main uses of melt-blown nonwovens and other innovative approaches are as follows.

Filtration 

Nonwoven melt-blown fabrics are porous. As a result, they can filter liquids and gases. Their applications include water treatment, masks, and air-conditioning filters. During the COVID-19 pandemic, the price of meltblown spiked from few thousand USD per ton to approximately 100 thousand USD per ton.

Sorbents 

Nonwoven materials can retain liquids several times their own weight. Thus, those made from polypropylene are ideal for collecting oil contamination.

Hygiene products 
The high absorption of melt-blown fabrics is exploited in disposable diapers and feminine hygiene products.

Apparels 

Melt-blown fabrics have three qualities that help make them useful for clothing, especially in harsh environments: thermal insulation, relative moisture resistance and breathability.

Drug delivery 

Melt blowing can produce drug-loaded fibers for controlled drug delivery. The high drug throughput rate (extrusion feeding), solvent-free operation and increased surface area of the product make melt blowing a promising new formulation technique.

References

External links 
  What is Melt-Blown Extrusion and How is it Used for Making Masks?

Polymer physics
Nanomaterials